A statue of Captain James Cook stood in Victoria, British Columbia, from 1976 until 2021, when it was toppled in a protest. It was a fibreglass copy of a bronze statue of 1912 by John Tweed in Whitby, Yorkshire, England. The Victoria Environmental Enhancement Foundation commissioned the work from Derek and Patricia Freeborn to mark the 200th anniversary of Cook's departure on his third voyage in 1776. The statue was unveiled on July 12, 1976, by William Richards Bennett, Premier of British Columbia. It stood on the Causeway, facing the Fairmont Empress hotel, with its back to the Inner Harbour.

The statue was smeared with red paint in August 2020. On the night of July 1 (Canada Day), 2021, it was broken at the knee and ankle and thrown in the Inner Harbour; its pedestal was covered in red handprints. A makeshift statue of a red dress, commemorating missing and murdered Indigenous women, was put up in its place. The following morning a totem pole in Malahat (30km away) was set on fire, apparently in retaliation for the toppling of the statue.

Following the toppling and vandalism of the statue, Ian Robertson, the CEO of the Greater Victoria Harbor Authority, announced that the statue would not return and the pedestal would be removed.

See also
 Statue of James Cook (Anchorage, Alaska) – another replica of Tweed's statue by the Freeborns, erected the same year
 Monuments and memorials in Canada removed in 2020–2022

References

External links

1976 sculptures
Destroyed sculptures
Monuments and memorials in British Columbia
Victoria, British Columbia
Sculptures of men in Canada
Statues removed in 2021
Statues in Canada
Vandalized works of art in Canada